Unio turtoni is a species of medium-sized freshwater mussel, an aquatic bivalve mollusk in the family Unionidae, the river mussels.

This species  is endemic to France and eastern Spain and is rarely found.

References

turtoni
Bivalves described in 1826
Taxonomy articles created by Polbot